Eurylaimus is a genus of broadbills (family Eurylaimidae) found in Southeast Asia.

Taxonomy
The genus Eurylaimus was introduced in 1821 by the American naturalist Thomas Horsfield to accommodate the banded broadbill (Eurylaimus javanicus).

Extant species
Two extant species are recognized:

Former species
Formerly, some authorities also considered the following species (or subspecies) as species within the genus Eurylaimus:
 Wattled broadbill (as Eurylaimus steerii)
 Visayan broadbill ( as Eurylaimus samarensis)
 Vanikoro flycatcher (as Platyrhynchos vanikorensis)
 Broad-billed flycatcher (as Platyrhynchos ruficollis)
 Satin flycatcher (as Platyrhynchos cyanoleucus)

References

 
Bird genera
Taxonomy articles created by Polbot